The Lance is the student newspaper at the University of Windsor in Windsor, Ontario, Canada.

See also
List of student newspapers in Canada
List of newspapers in Canada

External links
 The Lance University of Windsor
 The Lance @ Blogspot University of Windsor
 The Lance April Fools Archive The University of Windsor's Lance for a time would publish an April 1 parody issue.
 

Student newspapers published in Ontario
Newspapers published in Windsor, Ontario
University of Windsor
Publications with year of establishment missing